This is a list of colleges and universities of Mauritania.

Colleges and universities
In chronological order of foundation:
National School for Administration - (Ecole Nationale d’Administration, ENA) est 1966, which became the School for Technical Sciences - (Faculté des Sciences Techniques, FST) in 1995
Mauritanian Institute for Scientific Research - (Institut Mauritanien de Recherche Scientifique, IMRS) est 1974
Advanced Institute for Islamic Studies and Research - (Institut Supérieur d’Etudes et de Recherche Islamiques, ISERI) 1979 
Institute for Arab and Islamic Sciences 1979
Advanced Center for Technical Education - (Centre Supérieur d’Enseignement Technique, CSET) 1980
Nouakchott University (NU) - (Université de Nouakchott) 1981 
School of Law and Economics
School of Letters and Humanities
Advanced Scientific Institute - (Institut Supérieur Scientifique, ISS) 1986
National Institute for Special Medical Studies 1997

External links

International Network for Higher Education in Africa::Mauritania country profile

Universities
Mauritania
Mauritania